The Uganda woodland warbler (Phylloscopus budongoensis) is a species of Old World warbler in the family Phylloscopidae.
It is found in Cameroon, Republic of the Congo, Democratic Republic of the Congo, Equatorial Guinea, Gabon, Kenya, and Uganda.

Its natural habitat is subtropical or tropical moist lowland forests.

References

Uganda woodland warbler
Birds of Central Africa
Birds of East Africa
Uganda woodland warbler
Taxonomy articles created by Polbot